Cynognathus is an extinct genus of large-bodied cynodontian therapsids that lived in the Middle Triassic. It is known from a single species, Cynognathus crateronotus. Fossils have so far been recovered from South Africa, Argentina, Antarctica, and Namibia.

Description 

Its hindlimbs were placed directly beneath the body, but the forelimbs sprawled outwards in a more reptilian fashion. This form of double (erect/sprawling) gait is also found in some primitive mammals alive today.

Possible autapomorphies of C. crateronotus include an extremely elongated postorbital bar and sectorial postcanine teeth with two serrated cusps distal to a recurved apex.

Discovery and naming 
 
During 1888 and 1889, the British paleontologist Harry Govier Seeley visited southern Africa. In 1889, near Lady Frere, at a location where earlier Alfred Brown had discovered a tooth, Seeley excavated a skull and partial postcranial skeleton of a cynodontian. In 1894, Seeley named the genus Cynognathus with as type species Cynognathus crateronotus. Simultaneously, he named three other species in the genus: Cynognathus berryi, honouring James Berry who had assisted in the excavations, Cynognathus platyceps, the "flat jaw", and Cynognathus leptorhinus, the "slender nose".  The generic name Cynognathus is derived from Greek kyon and gnathos, meaning "dog jaw". In 1895, Seeley published a more comprehensive description of these finds.

Fossil material probably belonging to the genus has been given several different names over the years. Generic synonyms include Cynidiognathus, Cynogomphius, Karoomys, Lycaenognathus, Lycochampsa and Lycognathus.  Opinions vary as to whether all remains belong to the same species. The genus Karoomys is known only from from a tiny juvenile. Species-level synonyms of Cynognathus crateronotus include Cynidiognathus broomi, Cynidiognathus longiceps, Cynidiognathus merenskyi, Cynognathus berryi, Cynognathus minor, Cynognathus platyceps, Cynogomphius berryi, Karoomys browni, Lycaenognathus platyceps, Lycochampsa ferox, Lycognathus ferox, and Nythosaurus browni.

Distribution 

Fossils have been found in the Karoo, the Puesto Viejo Formation, Fremouw Formation, in South Africa/Lesotho, Argentina and Antarctica.

Cynognathus lived between the Anisian and the Ladinian (Middle Triassic).

This genus forms a Cynognathus Assemblage Zone in the Beaufort Group of the Karoo Supergroup.

Classification 
Seeley in 1894/1895 placed Cynognathus in a separate family Cynognathidae, within the Cynodontia. Cynognathus is presently the only recognized member of the family Cynognathidae. Later a clade Cynognathia was named after the genus, within the Eucynodontia.

Paleobiology 

The dentary was equipped with differentiated teeth that show this animal could effectively process its food before swallowing. The presence of a secondary palate in the mouth indicates that Cynognathus would have been able to breathe and swallow simultaneously.

The possible lack of belly ribs, in the stomach region, suggests the presence of an efficient diaphragm: an important muscle for mammalian breathing. Pits and canals on the bone of the snout indicate concentrations of nerves and blood vessels. In mammals, such structures allow hairs (whiskers) to be used as sensory organs.

See also 
Cynognathia
Evolution of mammals
Paleoworld- Featured in the episode "Tail Of A Sail".
Thrinaxodon
Tritylodontids

References

Further reading 

 Seeley (1895), "Researches on the structure, organization, and classification of the fossil Reptilia. Part IX., Section 5. On the skeleton in new Cynodontia from the Karroo rocks". Phil. Transactions of the Roy. Soc. of London, series B 186, p. 59–148.

Cynognathians
Prehistoric cynodont genera
Middle Triassic genus first appearances
Middle Triassic genus extinctions
Middle Triassic synapsids of Africa
Triassic Namibia
Fossils of Namibia
Omingonde Formation
Triassic South Africa
Fossils of South Africa
Triassic Tanzania
Fossils of Tanzania
Middle Triassic synapsids of South America
Triassic Argentina
Fossils of Argentina
Extinct animals of Antarctica
Triassic Antarctica
Fossils of Antarctica
Fossil taxa described in 1895
Taxa named by Harry Seeley